Erskineville railway station is located on the Illawarra line, serving the Sydney suburb of Erskineville. It is served by Sydney Trains T3 Bankstown line services.

History
The original Erskineville station, situated on the north side of Erskineville Road, opened on 15 October 1884 as part of the construction of the Illawarra line to Hurstville. A new station, constructed on the south side of the overbridge, opened on 16 June 1912. The lines through Erskineville were quadruplicated on 15 June 1913 with the current arrangement of platforms. Historically, the station was served by Bankstown, East Hills and Illawarra services, however since the early 1990s it has only been served by the former.

Immediately north of Erskineville, the Eastern Suburbs line emerges from underground to join the Illawarra line. This connection opened in 1979. Only the two western platforms are used, although the eastern pair are used by Eastern Suburbs and Illawarra line services when the Bankstown line is closed for engineering work.

To the west of the station lies two incomplete platforms. They were originally built in the 1970s as part of the construction of the Eastern Suburbs line when the alignment between Sydenham and Erskineville was expanded to accommodate six tracks. This was abandoned as a cost-cutting exercise. The CityRail Clearways Project envisaged reviving this plan, with stopping trains serving only the newly completed western platforms. However, this project was cancelled in November 2008.

Future
As part of the Sydney Metro project, in 2024 the Bankstown line will be converted to a rapid transit line with a new underground line north of Sydenham that will bypass Erskineville. The Illawarra services will then once again call at the station. 

The station is currently undergoing a major upgrade as part of the Transport Access Program. Due to space constraints, only one lift (to platform 1) is being built at the existing Erskineville Rd entrance. Instead, a new concourse off Bridge St with lifts to all 4 platforms is being built.

Platforms & services

Transport links
Transdev John Holland operate one route via Erskineville station:
355: Bondi Junction Interchange to Marrickville Metro

Trackplan

References

External links

Erskineville Station at Transport for New South Wales 

Railway stations in Sydney
Railway stations in Australia opened in 1884
Railway stations in Australia opened in 1912
Illawarra railway line
Bankstown railway line
City of Sydney